Nina Romberg has been an American writer since 1978. She wrote romance novels and Indian stories under the pseudonym Jane Archer and dark fantasy/horror fiction under Nina Romberg.

Biography
Nina Romberg has a degree in Graphic Design and is the former Creative Director for Book Publishers of Texas. Her first novel, Tender Torment, published in 1978, sold half a million copies. She is a Romantic Times Lifetime Achievement Award finalist.

Bibliography

As Jane Archer

Single novels
Tender Torment (1978)
Rebellious Rapture (1980)
Spring Dreams (1983)
Satin and Silver (1986)
Hidden Passions (1987)
Captive Dreams (1988)
Captive Desire (1989)
Rebel Seduction (1990)
Bayou Passion (1991)
Wild Wind! (1993)
Silken Spurs (1993)
Out of the West (1996)
Maverick Moon (1997)

Indian stories
Texas Indian Myths and Legends (2000)
The First Fire (2004)

As Nina Romberg

Marian Winchester Series
The Spirit Stalker (1989)
Shadow Walkers (1993)

References and sources

Living people
20th-century American novelists
21st-century American novelists
American romantic fiction writers
American women novelists
Women romantic fiction writers
20th-century American women writers
21st-century American women writers
Year of birth missing (living people)